The Japan Project: Made in Japan is a 52-minute documentary film by Terry Sanders that covers the story of the entry of Sony, Honda, Benihana, and Sega into the American market.

External links
Description at the American Film Foundation

Films directed by Terry Sanders
Documentary films about business
Documentary films about Japan